Avraham Yosef Shapira (2 March 1921 – 26 June 2000) was an Israeli politician and businessman.

Biography
Born in Romania in 1921, Shapira attended the Kokhav MeYa'akov yeshiva in Trzebinia, and was later certified as a teacher.  He made aliyah to Israel in 1949, and began working with his father, a furrier. In 1959 he bought a carpet factory, Carmel Carpets, in Or Akiva. At its peak the business employed 1,600 employees and had an annual turnover of $500 million.

He joined Agudat Yisrael, and became chairman of its Tel Aviv branch. He was elected to the Knesset on the party's list in 1981 and became chairman of the governing coalition. He was re-elected in 1984, after which he chaired the Finance Committee. He also served as chairman of the Bank of Israel's steering committee, wielding a strong influence on the country's financial state.

He lost his seat in the 1988 elections, but returned to the Knesset in 1992 (by which time the party had formed the United Torah Judaism alliance with Degel HaTorah). He lost his seat again in the 1996 elections.

He died in 2000 at the age of 79.

References

External links

1921 births
2000 deaths
Romanian Jews
Romanian emigrants to Israel
20th-century Israeli businesspeople
Agudat Yisrael politicians
United Torah Judaism leaders
People from Caesarea, Israel
Members of the 10th Knesset (1981–1984)
Members of the 11th Knesset (1984–1988)
Members of the 13th Knesset (1992–1996)